River Till may refer to three rivers in England:
River Till, Lincolnshire
River Till, Northumberland
River Till, Wiltshire